Anton Kerner Ritter von Marilaun, or Anton Joseph Kerner, (12 November 1831 – 21 June 1898) was an Austrian botanist and professor at the University of Vienna.

Career
Kerner was born in Mautern, Lower Austria, and studied medicine in Vienna followed by an education in natural history, for which he carried out phytosociologic studies in Central Europe. In 1858 Kerner was appointed professor of botany at the Polytechnic Institute at Buda, and then in 1860 was appointed professor of natural history at the University of Innsbruck. He resigned the latter position in 1878 to become professor of systematic botany at the University of Vienna, and also curator of the botanical garden there. As part of his expansive Flora exsiccata Austro-Hungarica exsiccata, von Marilaun recruited botanists including Richard Wettstein and Karl Eggerth.

Kerner was particularly active in the fields of phytogeography and phytosociology. He died in 1898 in Vienna at the age of 67.

He said "… and years pass by until a second generation [of plants] can develop stronger and richer on the prepared soil; but restless works the plant kingdom and constructs its green building further; on the corpses of perished roots, new, younger plant forms germinate, and so it goes on in tireless change until, finally, the shady treetops of a high forest murmur above a humus rich soil."

Publications
 Das Pflanzenleben der Donauländer (The Background of Plant Ecology, translated by Henry S. Conard, 1951), Innsbruck, 1863. This book established his reputation and reports on his botanical explorations in Hungary.
 Die Kultur der Alpenflanzen, 1864. On the culture of alpine plants.
 Die botanischen Gärten, 1874. A sketch of a model botanical garden.
 Vegetationsverhältnisse des mittlern und östlichen Ungarn und Siebenbürgen, Innsbruck, 1875.
 See also HTML version 
One of his most important works.
In 1867, he finished the publication of the results of his studies with respect to the limits of vegetation of more than a thousand species of plants.

See also

 Frederic Clements
 Eugenius Warming

Notes

References
Knoll, Fritz (1950): "Anton Kerner von Marilaun, ein Erforscher des Pflanzenlebens." in: "Oesterreichische Naturforscher und Techniker" ed. Austrian Academy of Sciences, Vienna, 216 p.
Petz-Grabenbauer, Maria, Kiehn, Michael (2004): "Anton Kerner von Marilaun", Verlag der Österreichischen Akademie der Wissenschaften, Vienna, .

External links

 
Petz-Grabenbauer, Maria, Kiehn, Michael (2004): "Anton Kerner von Marilaun" - A new book about Anton Kerner von Marilaun published by the Austrian Academy of Sciences (written in German)
Chrono-biographical Sketch: Anton Kerner von Marilaun
Obituary of Anton Kerner von Marilaun written by Otto Stapf, Nature 58, 251 - 252 (1898)
Full text of The Natural History of Plants, Their Forms, Growth, Reproduction, and Distribution: from the German of Anton Kerner von Marilaun (Volume 1) (1895-96)
Full text of The Natural History of Plants, Their Forms, Growth, Reproduction, and Distribution: from the German of Anton Kerner von Marilaun (Volume 2) (1895-96)
Digitalized books written by Anton Kerner von Marilaun, mostly English translations
PNAS-Artikel written by Thomas Hartmann about the lost origins of chemical ecology in the 19th century (containing a paragraph about Anton Kerner von Marilaun, p. 4542)

1831 births
1898 deaths
19th-century Austrian botanists
Austrian knights
Academic staff of the University of Vienna
Academic staff of the University of Innsbruck
Members of the Royal Society of Sciences in Uppsala